Katarzyna ("Kasia") Baranowska (born 13 September 1987 in Szczecin, Poland) is an Olympic swimmer from Poland who specializes in the individual medley. She swam for Poland at the 2008 Summer Olympics.

At the 2008 Olympics, she set the Polish Records in the 200 and 400 IMs (2:12.13 and 4:36.95).

References

1987 births
Living people
Polish female medley swimmers
Sportspeople from Szczecin
Swimmers at the 2008 Summer Olympics
Swimmers at the 2016 Summer Olympics
Olympic swimmers of Poland
European Aquatics Championships medalists in swimming